Daem may refer to:
 Daem, Kerman
 Daem, South Khorasan